The Lenkov-verse is a media franchise that consists of a group of three interconnected television reboots that share a fictional universe, and their related media. All three of the television series, Hawaii Five-0, MacGyver, and Magnum P.I., are developed by Peter M. Lenkov who also served as the showrunner on the series. They are each American crime dramas that aired on CBS. Hawaii Five-0 revolves around a task force, led by Steve McGarrett, that investigates crimes in Hawaii. MacGyver centers around Angus MacGyver who uses nonviolent methods to keep the world safe, with the help of a team of undercover government agents. Magnum P.I. follows private investigator Thomas Magnum, who solves crimes in Hawaii with the help of his friends. The universe is also connected to the so-called Bellisario-verse, which consists of the entire NCIS franchise and JAG, via two direct crossovers between Hawaii Five-0 and NCIS: Los Angeles.

 On May 6, 2020, the remaining series in the franchise, MacGyver and Magnum P.I., were renewed for their fifth and third seasons, respectively, for the 2020–21 broadcast season. On July 7, 2020, it was reported that Lenkov was fired from his role as executive producer and showrunner on MacGyver and Magnum P.I, following an investigation into allegations that he created a toxic work environment. Monica Macer and Eric Guggenheim replaced Lenkov as showrunner, on MacGyver and Magnum P.I, respectively. On November 9, 2020, it was announced that the fifth season of MacGyver and the third season of Magnum P.I, would premiere on December 4, 2020. In April 2021, CBS announced that MacGyver would end after its fifth season. Later that month, Magnum P.I. was renewed for a fourth season, which premiered on October 1, 2021. In May 2022, Magnum P.I. was cancelled after four seasons, however, on June 30, 2022, the series was picked up by NBC with a two-season, twenty-episode order, which was later clarified to be split as a two-part fifth season rather than two separate seasons. The fifth season premiered on February 19, 2023.

Development

Television

Up until the reboot of MacGyver in 2016, CBS's Hawaii Five-0 was the only show in The Lenkov-verse. Debuting in September 2010, the show had enjoyed solid ratings and had helped to boost Hawaii's economy with increased tourist visits to local businesses and cultural sites featured on the show. Despite solid viewership during its first season and the ability to hold its own against powerhouses like ESPN's NFL Monday Night Football and ABC's Castle, Five-0 wasn't pulling the same ratings as CBS's flagship police procedural, NCIS. As such, Peter Lenkov outlined that the second season would have a lot more to it, promising new cast members and an expanded setting, stating, “…we wanted to explore the other islands, and I think we just never got the chance. We're going to do that this year. We have these little ambitions, and that's one of them. Because it's Hawaii Five-0 and not Oahu Five-0, they can go to the other islands. And ultimately we want to explore off the islands. It's a task force, and the idea is there are no real boundaries for them." But an even bigger surprise came two months later on August 18, 2011, just prior to the 2nd season premiere, when NCIS: Los Angeles star Daniela Ruah tweeted, "Aloha hoaloha!  Read my lips closely... Kensi will make her way to Hawaii Five-0 this season! Stay tuned... #H50 #NCISLA", hinting that Five-0 would not only expand to other islands, but to other shows. It also left NCIS fans to speculate that Ruah was leaving her show for greener pastures. Shortly after the news was confirmed, however, Ruah tweeted that it was a one-time crossover and that she would be coming back to her regular show while NCIS producer Shane Brennan mused “Interestingly, Daniela has never been to Hawaii, so it took no convincing,” Brennan also stated that the visit to the show wasn't gratuitous and would have a purpose, jokingly adding, "I’m a bit concerned they might not give her back!"

Five-0 viewers wouldn't have to wait long for a second crossover with NCIS. At the beginning of 2012, CBS approached Brennan with the idea of a two-part crossover event for May Sweeps involving both Hawaii Five-0 and NCIS: Los Angeles to which Brennan agreed. While Brennan was thrilled about the "high-octane story" that would bring out the best in both shows, Five-0 producer Peter Lenkov was excited about exploring the relationship between the two main characters of both shows: Five-0 Task Force leader Steven McGarrett and NCIS's Sam Hanna, who became friends during their military service. “Chris and LL are going to come to Hawaii” Lenkov said. "There’s a bit of a history there.” The two-part episode, titled "Pa Make Loa (Touch of Death)", drew big ratings for both shows. Five-0 saw over 14 million viewers(Live/Delayed DVR figures combined) while NCIS: Los Angeles saw over 18 million viewers(Live/Delayed DVR figures combined). NCIS producer Shane Brennan remarked that the reaction with fans and critics seemed largely positive and added "Crossovers are not easy to pull off when you're working in the same town, and when you've got the other show being shot a five-hour flight away, it's particularly challenging." Nonetheless, Brennan again expressed optimism for a future crossover with Five-0, stating, "I think the audiences are willing to accept crossovers when both shows operate in the same world and that was certainly the case with NCIS and Hawaii Five-0. Having them overlap in terms of crimes was very easy for us to do. Whether or not we'll do more is up to CBS. It's something I'd be very happy to do again." Lenkov was equally acquiescent, stating, “It just seemed like a natural to continue the relationship.”

Despite the seemingly good rapport between the production crews of Five-0 and NCIS, the two shows would not see another crossover again nor was there a single crossover between Five-0 and another show until 2016, when viewers saw the debut of Lenkov's second "universe" offering, the CBS reboot of the 1985 ABC series, MacGyver. Immediately, Peter Lenkov hinted that MacGyver was not only in the same universe as Hawaii Five-0 but that he was forced to cut a scene in the pilot episode of MacGyver where Jack Dalton's sniper rifle had "ALOHA" painted on the barrel of the gun as a nod to Five-0s Steve McGarrett. "...the idea was that he knew McGarrett...in the military. I still would like to take advantage of that." Lenkov told the press, adding, "Somehow we’ll do a cross-over and those two guys knew each other. I’m hoping." While Lenkov's wish for a McGarrett/Dalton crossover never came to fruition (Hawaii Five-0 ended in 2020 and George Eads who plays Dalton left MacGyver in the middle of season three), the first season of MacGyver officially and firmly placed the series in the same fictional universe as Five-0 with the episode, "Magnifying Glass". In the episode, MacGyver and the Phoenix Foundation travel to Northern California to track down a copycat serial murderer who has been mimicking San Francisco's infamous Zodiac Killer. When they find out that the killer has been mentored and trained remotely from Oahu by Dr. Madison Gray (a serial killer who fled Hawaii for California in a preceding Five-0 episode), Jack Dalton notifies Steve McGarrett of the 5-0 Task Force that Gray has returned to Hawaii. This plot thread continued into Five-0, with the episode, "Hahai i na pilikua nui (Hunting Monsters)" in which Chin Ho Kelly follows up on Dalton's tip-off, telling McGarrett "that call from your friends at the Phoenix Foundation wasn't wrong". After this set-up, Five-0 actors Daniel Dae Kim, Grace Park, and Taylor Wily crossed over into the MacGyver episode "Flashlight". In the episode, The Phoenix Foundation is sent to Oahu to help the Hawaii Police Department and Five-0 with rescue and recovery efforts and ends up working closely with Chin Ho Kelly and Kono. The episode closes out with Kamekona traveling to California to cater MacGyver's birthday party with a shrimp buffet. The Phoenix Foundation was subsequently mentioned in the Five-0 episode that aired immediately following "Flashlight" when Steve McGarrett tells Kono that The Phoenix Foundation appreciated the help from herself and Chin Ho Kelly. After Henry Ian Cusick joined MacGyver as the new owner of The Phoenix Foundation, Cusick tweeted a selfie of himself and actor Jorge Garcia (of Five-0, proclaiming, "Look who came out to playyayy!!!" Immediately, fans speculated on whether this meant that Garcia was coming to MacGyver and reprising his role as Jerry Ortega or as a completely new character. CBS would later confirm that Garcia was going to reprise his role as Jerry in the 5th season with a Tweet which read, Anyone call for a conspiracy theorist? @jorgegarcia (Jerry Ortega from @HawaiiFive0CBS) will guest star on an upcoming episode of #MacGyver!", confirming the next crossover event between MacGyver and the cancelled Hawaii Five-0.

Numerous Five-0 characters guest starred in the first season of Magnum, most notably Kimee Balmilero and Taylor Wily who had recurring roles before a full crossover aired between the two shows in their tenth and second seasons, respectively. In a third season episode of Five-0, McGarrett, Williams, Bergman, and Kamekona, have a discussion about the television show Magnum, P.I. and its theme song, causing a continuity issue when the two series later crossover. Lenkov said "That was at a time when I had lost hope that I could get [my Magnum reboot] launched. I had been trying to do it for so long, I thought there was just no way it was going to happen, so I did a little tribute in that episode. But we’ll take that one out of rotation."

Other actors, such as Henry Ian Cusick, Corbin Bernsen, Lance Gross, Elisabeth Röhm, Patrick Monahan, Andre Reed, and Janel Parrish have played various characters in the different series, also causing continuity issues that were not addressed. In March 2021, Katrina Law was cast in the recurring role of Jessica Knight in NCIS, the parent series of NCIS: Los Angeles, furthering the continuity concern.

Franchise overview

Television series

Hawaii Five-0 (2010–2020) 

Hawaii Five-0 is the first series in the universe and is a reboot of the 1968 TV series of the same name. The rebooted series uses the numerical zero in place of the letter O (Five-0 instead of Five-O). It premiered on September 20, 2010, and aired 240 episodes over a ten-season run before concluding on April 3, 2020. The series focuses on a fictional state police task force, known as "Five-0" led by Steve McGarrett, that is set up by the Hawaiian governor to fight major crimes in Hawaii including murder, kidnapping, and terrorism. The series is filmed on location in Hawaii.

MacGyver (2016–2021) 

MacGyver is the second series in the universe and is a reboot of the 1985 TV series of the same name. It premiered on September 23, 2016, and aired 94 episodes over a five-season run before concluding on April 30, 2021. The series focuses on the fictional "Phoenix Foundation" which is a covert organization masquerading as a think tank. The titular character, Angus MacGyver uses a talent for problem solving along with an extensive knowledge in science to solve problems. The series is set in Los Angeles, California, but is filmed in Atlanta, Georgia.

Magnum P.I. (2018–present) 

Magnum P.I. is the third series in the universe and is a reboot of the 1980 TV series of the same name. It premiered on September 24, 2018, and after a four-season run on CBS, a fifth season premiered on NBC on February 19, 2023. The series focuses on a Navy SEAL turned private investigator named Thomas Magnum who investigates various crimes around Hawaii. Like Hawaii Five-0, the series is filmed in Hawaii.

Related
The universe is also connected to the NCIS franchise series, NCIS: Los Angeles, which had two direct fictional crossovers with Hawaii Five-0. Potential crossover opportunities between Magnum P.I. and NCIS: Hawaiʻi were considered possible as both series film in Hawaii.

Other media
Two of the television series have also spawned other media that are related to the series' themselves. On October 4, 2011, a television soundtrack entitled  Hawaii Five-0: Original Songs from the Television Series was released featuring music that was used in Hawaii Five-0. In addition, a survival manual was released on September 17, 2019, entitled The Official MacGyver Survival Manual: 155 Ways to Save the Day that gives instructions on how to "MacGyver" things as seen in MacGyver.

Season overview

Cast and characters

Lenkov has been noted on his use of gender flipping of characters in his reboots. The character of Kono Kalakaua was portrayed by Zulu as a male character in the original Five-O but by Grace Park as a female character in the rebooted Five-0. Jean Smart was cast to play Governor Pat Jameson in the reboot as opposed to Paul Jameson in the original, and Larisa Oleynik was cast to play Jenna Kaye in the reboot as opposed to Jonathan Kaye in the original. In MacGyver, the character of Peter Thornton was renamed to Patricia Thornton, while in Magnum the character of Jonathan Higgins was renamed to Juliet Higgins to allow for gender flipping. Names of original Five-O cast members and characters although changed but non-gender swapped serve as the namesake for rebooted Five-0 characters, actors Richard Denning and Danny Kamekona from the original Five-O serve as the namesake for Governor Richard Denning and confidential informant Kamekona Tupuola in the reboot; while characters Doc Bergman and Che Fong serve as the namesake for Max Bergman and Charlie Fong, respectively, in the reboot.. Numerous Five-0 recurring characters who never received main billing have also appeared in Magnum as the same character including Larry Manetti as Nicky “The Kid” DeMarco,  Shawn Mokuahi Garnett as Flippa, William Forsythe as P.I. Harry Brown, and Willie Garson as Gerard Hirsch. In addition a few actors who portrayed characters on original versions of the series have returned to portray the same or different characters in their respective reboots. Although not officially portrayed by the original actor Jack Lord who played the original Steve McGarrett appeared in a seventh season episode of the reboot as an unnamed character with CGI effects along with a body and voice double being used to replicate the appearance of Lord. Dennis Chun, the son of Kam Fong Chun who played the original Chin Ho Kelly, who stars as Duke Lukela in Five-0 and Magnum previously portrayed minor characters on both the original Five-O and Magnum. Al Harrington portrayed series regular Ben on the original Five-O as well as other minor characters on the original Five-O and Magnum series, in the 2010 reboot of Five-O he stars as recurring character Mamo Kahike. Ed Asner portrayed August March in the 1968 Five-O and also reprised his role in the second and third seasons of the rebooted series. Manetti previously starred as the original Rick in the original Magnum before portraying DeMarco in the rebooted Five-0 and Magnum. The universe has also been cited for causing Lost reunions between cast members. Daniel Dae Kim, Jorge Garcia, Henry Ian Cusick, and Five-0s recurring star Terry O'Quinn and guest stars Rebecca Mader, Tania Raymonde and others all appeared on Lost as well as Five-0 with Kim, Garcia, and Cusick, also appearing on MacGyver.

Main characters

Crossovers

The first crossover Five-0 had actually occurred outside the Lenkov-verse and occurred between Five-0 and NCIS: Los Angeles. During the second season episode "Ka Hakaka Maika'i", Daniela Ruah made a guest appearance as her NCIS: LA character Kensi Blye.

A second crossover event with the two series happened with "Touch of Death" later in the same season.

Note: Due to the amount at which Five-0 actors crossover into Magnum, guest-appearances by Five-0 actors in Magnum are listed in a separate table.

Production
Lenkov, Guggenheim, and David Wolkove have all written for Hawaii Five-0 and Magnum P.I, with Lenkov also having written for MacGyver. Lenkov wrote fifty-eight episodes of Hawaii Five-0, seven of MacGyver, and fifteen of Magnum P.I. Guggenheim has written twenty-five episodes of Hawaii Five-0 and sixteen of Magnum P.I. Wolkove has written forty-eight episodes of Hawaii Five-0 and two episodes of Magnum P.I. The series have also used many of the same directors.

Notes

References

 
Mass media franchises introduced in 2010
Hawaii Five-O
MacGyver
Magnum, P.I.
NCIS: Los Angeles
Paramount Global franchises
Television franchises
Television controversies in the United States